Laurence J. "Larry" Cain,  (born January 9, 1963) is a Canadian sprint canoeist. He was the first Canadian canoeist since Frank Amyot to win an Olympic gold medal in canoeing.

Early life
Cain was born in Toronto, Ontario. He attended Oakville Trafalgar High School.

Career
Cain began his career in 1974 at the Oakville Racing Canoe Club, now the Burloak Canoe Club, in Oakville, Ontario. 

Cain competed in three Summer Olympics, winning a gold medal in the C-1 500 m, and a silver medal in the C1 1000 m events.  He also won a silver medal in the C-1 1000 m event at the 1989 ICF Canoe Sprint World Championships in Plovdiv.

In 1984, he was made a Member of the Order of Canada. In 1997, he was inducted into Canada's Sports Hall of Fame.  A trail in Oakville has been named in his honour running along the town's waterfront where Cain trained.

Cain taught Physical Education at St. Mildred's-Lightbourn School until 2014. He then worked as a coach, preparing paddlers for the Olympic Games in Rio.

In 2016 Cain founded an online paddle-training company called Paddle Monster for standup paddleboarding. Cain also coached High Performance Canoeing at Burloak Canoe Club.

References

External links
Official website
Larry Cain at The Canadian Encyclopedia
Canada's Sports Hall of Fame citation
CBC archives

Paddle Monster

1963 births
Living people
Canoeists at the 1984 Summer Olympics
Canoeists at the 1988 Summer Olympics
Canoeists at the 1992 Summer Olympics
Canadian educators
Canadian male canoeists
McMaster University alumni
Members of the Order of Canada
Olympic canoeists of Canada
Olympic gold medalists for Canada
Olympic silver medalists for Canada
People from Oakville, Ontario
Canoeists from Toronto
Olympic medalists in canoeing
ICF Canoe Sprint World Championships medalists in Canadian
Canadian schoolteachers
Medalists at the 1984 Summer Olympics